Edgar Selwyn (October 20, 1875 – February 13, 1944) was a prominent figure in American theatre and film in the first half of the 20th century. An actor, playwright, director and producer on Broadway, he founded a theatrical production company with his brother, Archibald Selwyn, and owned a number of Selwyn Theatres in the United States. He transferred his talents from the stage to motion pictures, and directed a film for which Helen Hayes received the Academy Award for Best Actress. Selwyn co-founded Goldwyn Pictures in 1916.

Biography
Born in Cincinnati, Ohio, Selwyn flourished in the Broadway theater as an actor, playwright, director, and producer from 1899 to 1942. With his brother Archibald Selwyn (November 3, 1877 – June 21, 1959)  he founded the theatrical production company The Selwyns which produced plays on Broadway from 1919 to 1932 (see, e.g., Wedding Bells). The Selwyns owned several theatres in the United States including the Park Square Theatre in Boston; the Hanna Theatre in Cleveland, Ohio; the Selwyn in Chicago; and the Selwyn, Apollo, and Times Square theatres in New York City.

Selwyn also worked in Hollywood, producing and directing eight films between 1929 and 1942. Among these was The Sin of Madelon Claudet (1931), which Selwyn directed for Metro-Goldwyn-Mayer. The film starred Helen Hayes, who won an Academy Award for her performance. Additionally, Selwyn wrote two screenplays and many more films were adapted from his original plays. He died in Los Angeles, California.

In April 1912 Selwyn and his wife, playwright Margaret Mayo, held tickets to New York on the RMS Titanic but did not make the trip as he had a prior engagement to hear the reading of a new play in Paris. They had had plans to accompany Broadway producer Henry B. Harris and his wife Renee with whom they had been touring Europe and Algiers. Selwyn's commitment to hearing the play, while others tried to goad him to board the ship, more than likely saved his life.

His second wife was actress Ruth Selwyn (née Wilcox; formerly Snyder, later Warburton; 1905–1954), a sister of director Fred M. Wilcox and sister-in-law of Nicholas Schenck.

Partial filmography
 Pierre of the Plains (1914) (actor, play)
 The Arab (1915) (actor, play)
 For Better, for Worse (1919) (play)
 The Mirage (1924) (play)
 The Sin of Madelon Claudet (1931) (director)
 Skyscraper Souls (1932) (director)
 Men Must Fight (1933) (director)
 Turn Back the Clock (1933) (director and co-writer)
 The Mystery of Mr. X (1934) (director)

References

External links

1875 births
1944 deaths
American male screenwriters
American film directors
American theatre managers and producers
American film production company founders
Businesspeople from Cincinnati
Burials at Salem Fields Cemetery
Screenwriters from Ohio
Film producers from Ohio
20th-century American male writers
20th-century American screenwriters